Ngaire May Naffine (born 1954)   is an Australian feminist legal academic and Professor Emerita at the University of Adelaide.

Life 
Born in 1954 Ngaire May Naffin, she changed her surname to Naffine in 1987. She graduated from the University of Adelaide with an LLB, followed by a PhD in 1983 on "Criminality, deviance and conformity in women".

Her research interests have focussed on women, both as victims and perpetrators of crime, feminist jurisprudence and medical law. Before her retirement, she was Bonython Professor of Law at the University of Adelaide, having spent the majority of her career at that university, with visiting appointments to Birkbeck College at the University of London, the European University Institute in Florence, Italy, the Cleveland-Marshall College of Law in Cleveland, Ohio and the Osgoode Hall Law School on Toronto, Canada.

Naffine was elected a Fellow of the Academy of the Social Sciences in Australia in 2006 and a Corresponding Fellow of the British Academy in 2020. 

In 2016 she presented the Shirley Smith Address in New Zealand on "Manliness, Male Right and Criminal law: the Uses of Criminal Law in the Formation of the Character of the Male Legal Person".

Selected works 
In addition to the books listed below, Naffine has co-edited many legal texts, as well as contributing chapters to other publications.

Books

As editor

References 

1954 births
Living people
University of Adelaide alumni
Academic staff of the University of Adelaide
Australian legal scholars
Fellows of the Academy of the Social Sciences in Australia
Corresponding Fellows of the British Academy